"Joanna" is a song written by the English husband and wife song-writing team Tony Hatch and Jackie Trent which was first a song for the American singer-songwriter Scott Walker in 1968. The song was Walker's second solo single in the UK. The accompaniment was directed by Peter Knight.

While credited to Hatch and Trent journalist Joe Jackson writes in his article "The Fugitive Kind" that Walker wrote a significant proportion of the lyric. Jackson quotes Walker as follows: 'that whole verse about "lived in your eyes completely" is mine and I wrote the last line in the song, "you may remember me and change your mind"'.

"Joanna" was a major hit and is one of Walker's most popular recordings spending eleven weeks on the UK Singles Chart and peaking at number 7 in June 1968. An instrumental arrangement on the song was used as the theme for Walker's BBC TV series, Scott in 1969.

The single was backed with the 1967 Scott album track "Always Coming Back to You". The accompaniment of the b-side was directed by Reg Guest. Japanese editions are backed with "The Plague", which was previously released as the b-side to "Jackie" in 1967.

Track listing

Chart positions

References

1968 singles
1968 songs
Scott Walker (singer) songs
Philips Records singles
Songs written by Tony Hatch
Songs written by Jackie Trent